Dennis Chávez (1888–1962) was a U.S. Senator from New Mexico from 1935 to 1962. Senator Chavez may also refer to:

Fabian Chavez Jr. (1924–2013), New Mexico Senate
Martin Chávez (born 1952), New Mexico State Senate